The Ottoman–Safavid War of 1603–1618 consisted of two wars between Safavid Persia under Abbas I of Persia and the Ottoman Empire under Sultans Mehmed III, Ahmed I, and Mustafa I. The first war began in 1603 and ended with a Safavid victory in 1612, when Persia regained and reestablished its suzerainty over the Caucasus and Western Iran, which had been lost at the Treaty of Constantinople in 1590. The second war began in 1615 and ended in 1618 with minor territorial adjustments.

Course

Safavid attack and early successes (1603–1604) 

As a result of the Ottoman–Safavid War (1578–1590) the Ottomans had gained swaths of the Safavid territories in the northwest and west, including Shirvan, Dagestan, most of Azerbaijan, Kartli, Kakheti, Luristan, and Khuzestan.

Abbas I had recently undertaken a major reform of the Safavid army through the English gentleman of fortune Robert Shirley and the shah's favorite ghulam and chancellor Allahverdi Khan.

When Abbas I decided to attack the Ottomans to recover the large territories lost in the previous war, the Ottomans were engaged heavily in the European front due to the Long Turkish War started in 1593. Furthermore, the Ottomans were troubled in Eastern Anatolia because of the Jelali revolts, the Karayazıcı rebellion (1598–1602) being the most destructive one. Constantinople, the capital of the Ottoman Empire was also in turmoil in the beginning of 1603 as the tension between the Janissaries and the Sipahis were only to be eased temporarily with the intervention of the Palace.

Thus, the Safavid attack on 26 September 1603 caught the Ottomans unprepared and forced them to fight in two distant fronts. Abbas I first recaptured Nahavand and destroyed the fortress in the city, which the Ottomans had planned to use as an advance base for attacks on Iran. The Safavid army was able to capture Tabriz on 21 October 1603. For the first time, the Iranians made great use of their artillery and the town – which had been ruined by Ottoman occupation – soon fell. Local citizens welcomed the Safavid army as liberators and took harsh reprisals against the defeated Ottoman Turks who had been occupying their city. Many unfortunate Turks fell into the hands of Tabriz's citizens and were decapitated. The Safavids entered Nakhchivan at the same month soon after the city was evacuated by the Ottomans. The Safavid army then laid siege to Yerevan on 15 November 1603. Safavid armies captured Tbilisi and both Kartli and Kakheti became Safavid dependencies once again.

Unsuccessful Ottoman counter-attack (1604–1605) 

While facing disasters on the Eastern front, Mehmed III died on 20 December 1603 at the age of 37. The new sultan Ahmed I who was 13 years old appointed Cigalazade Yusuf Sinan Pasha as the commander of the eastern army who marched from Istanbul 15 June 1604, a very late time for the campaigning season. Until he reached the front on 8 November 1604, the Safavid army had already captured Yerevan in June and advanced towards Kars before being stopped in Akhaltsikhe. Seeing the late season as an excuse, he did not counter-attack Abbas I and decided to stay in Van until the end of the winter. However, the Safavid advance forced him to march towards Erzurum. The inactivity created unrest among the Turkish ranks.

His campaign of 1605 was unsuccessful, the forces he led towards Tabriz suffering defeat near the shore of Lake Urmia on 9 September 1605. This was the first Safavid pitched victory against the Ottomans in their history. In this battle Abbas I utilized his predominantly cavalry force to great advantage, decisively defeating the Ottomans, who suffered some 20,000 dead. Kose Sefer Pasha, Beylerbey of Erzurum, acted independently and was captured by Safavid forces. Cağaloğlu had to withdraw to the fortress of Van and thence in the direction of Diyarbakır. He ordered the execution of Canbulatoğlu Hüseyin Pasha claiming he was late to reinforce the Ottoman army which caused a larger unrest. Sinan died in the course of this retreat in December 1605 and Abbas I was able to liberate Ganja, Baku, Shirvan, and Shamakhi in Azerbaijan in June 1606.

The Ottomans focus on western and internal fronts (1605–1609) 

The Ottomans focused on the western front and the successful campaign of 1605 against the Holy Roman Empire under the command of Grand Vizier Sokolluzade Lala Mehmed Pasha ameliorated the situation in Hungary, which paved the way to the Peace of Zsitvatorok in 1606. Ahmed I appointed Lala Mehmed Pasha as the commander of the eastern front who died suddenly on 25 June 1606.

The absence of an effective Ottoman army created a power vacuum in the Empire's eastern fronts. Thus, Jelali revolts reached its zenith as Tavil Ahmed captured Harput and his son Mehmed overthrew the Ottoman authority in Baghdad and defeated the Ottoman force under Nasuh Pasha who was sent to restore order in Iraq. Baghdad was cleared of rebels only in 1607 while Fakhr-al-Din II extended his authority in Lebanon and western Syria with the alliance of another rebel Canbulatoğlu Ali Pasha who challenged Sultan's authority in Adana.

With the advantage of peace on the western front the Ottoman Empire gave its priority to the eastern front. The army under the command of Grand Vizier Kuyucu Murad Pasha decided to crush the rebellions first to secure the back of the army against the Safavids. Tens of thousands of Anatolians were killed during Murad Pasha's office in his campaigns (1607–1609) against separate large rebel groups.

The renewed Ottoman counter-attack and peace (1610–1612) 
When the order was restored, Murad Pasha marched against Abbas I who was in Tabriz in 1610. Although the two armies met in Acıçay, north of Tabriz, no engagement or action took place. Due to the problems in the logistics, supply chain and the approaching winter, Murad Pasha withdrew his forces to Diyarbakır. While being engaged in diplomatic correspondence with Abbas I for peace and preparing his army for another campaign at the same time he died on 5 August 1611 when he was older than 90.

Nasuh Pasha was appointed as the new grand vizier and the commander of the eastern armies. He sued for peace, too, and accepted the proposal of the Safavid side in 1611. The Treaty of Nasuh Pasha was signed on 20 November 1612. The agreement secured the 1555 borders envisaged by the Peace of Amasya. Shah Abbas however, committed himself to send 200 bales of raw silk annually.

The vulnerable peace (1612–1615) 
In practice the Treaty of Nasuh Pasha was little more than a truce, as the Ottomans remained determined to reverse the Safavid conquests, and it was not long before war broke out again.

Between 1612 and 1615 Abbas I refused to send the silks he promised and this created another pretext for the renewal of hostilities. The Safavid army was able to restore the suzerainty on the eastern Georgian princedoms.

War breaks out again (1615–1618) 

The Ottomans decided to go to war again in 1615. Grand Vizier Öküz Mehmed Pasha was appointed as the commander who postponed the envisaged campaign to 1616. This inaction gave the Safavids sufficient time to reinforce the border strongholds. The Safavid emissary to Istanbul returned to Iran with empty hands.

In April 1616, Öküz Mehmed Pasha marched from Aleppo towards Kars, reinforced the castle and sent two forces to Yerevan and Nihavand which was taken by the Safavids in 1603 soon after the fall of Tabriz. Soon afterwards, he led his armies to Yerevan, defeated a small Safavid force and laid siege to the city. The Ottomans lacked adequate siege weapons and the defenders fought well. The Ottomans suffered major casualties from both the cold and the Safavid forces. Öküz Mehmed Pasha lifted the unsuccessful siege and withdrew to Erzurum. Due to his failure, he was dismissed and was replaced by Damat Halil Pasha on 17 November 1616 who was sent to lead the armies in the eastern front.

When Damat Halil Pasha proceeded to the front, the Crimean forces looted Ganja, Nakhchivan, and Julfa. However, the year 1617 passed without any significant engagement.

Back in Istanbul, the Ottoman throne saw consequent changes. Ahmed I died on 22 November 1617 when he was 27 years old. Ahmed I's early death created a dilemma never before experienced by the Ottoman Empire. Multiple princes were now eligible for the Sultanate, and all of them lived in Topkapı Palace. A court faction headed by the Şeyhülislam Esad Efendi and Sofu Mehmed Pasha (who represented the Grand Vizier when he was away from Istanbul) decided to enthrone Mustafa instead of Ahmed's son Osman. It was the first time an Ottoman Sultan was succeeded by his brother instead of his son. It was hoped that regular social contact would improve Mustafa's mental health, but his behavior remained eccentric. In 1618, after a short rule, another palace faction deposed him in favour of his young nephew Osman II.

Osman II designated Öküz Mehmed Pasha once again for the eastern front. Abbas learnt the Ottoman plan was to invade via Azerbaijan, take Tabriz then move on to Ardabil and Qazvin, which they could use as bargaining chips to exchange for other territories. The shah decided to lay a trap. He would allow the Ottomans to enter the country, then destroy them. He had Tabriz evacuated of its inhabitants while he waited at Ardabil with his army. In 1618, an Ottoman army of 100,000 led by the grand vizier invaded and easily seized Tabriz. The vizier sent an ambassador to the shah demanding he make peace and return the lands taken since 1603. Abbas refused and pretended he was ready to set fire to Ardabil and retreat further inland rather than face the Ottoman army. When the vizier heard the news, he decided to march on Ardabil right away. This was just what Abbas wanted. His army of 40,000 commanded by Qarachaqay Khan was hiding at a crossroads on the way and they ambushed the Ottoman army in the battle of Sufiyan on 10 September 1618, which ended in complete victory for the Iranians. The beylerbeys of Rumelia, Diyarbakır, and Van were among thousands who lost their lives.

The new Grand Vizier Damat Halil Pasha took command, continued the invasion. When the Ottoman army started to threaten Ardabil the Safavids sued for peace.

The terms of the treaty was similar to those of the treaty of Nasuh Pasha with several minor rectifications of the border line. Also, the annual tribute of the Persian side was reduced from 200 loads to 100 loads of silk.

See also 
 Treaty of Nasuh Pasha
 Treaty of Serav
 List of conflicts in the Middle East
 Ottoman–Persian Wars

References

Sources 
 
 
 
 
 Conflict and Conquest in the Islamic World, A Historical Encyclopedia, volume 1, page 699.

17th-century conflicts
Ottoman–Persian Wars
17th century in Georgia (country)
17th century in Iran
1600s in the Ottoman Empire
1610s in the Ottoman Empire
17th century in Armenia
17th century in Azerbaijan
Wars involving Safavid Iran